The following is John Denver's comprehensive filmography, listed from the newest to the oldest, organized in tiers in accordance with the dates of recording or airing (in the television category). The filmography does not include any appearances of Denver post-1997 (excluding music usage and documentaries).

Filmography

Acting
Walking Thunder (1997) … John McKay
Higher Ground (1988) … Jim Clayton (TV movie)
Foxfire (1987) … Dillard Nations (TV movie)
The Christmas Gift (1986) … George Billings (TV movie)
The Disney Sunday Movie
- Episode "The Leftovers" (1986) … Max Sinclair (TV movie)
Fire and Ice (1986) … Narrator
Oh, God! (1977) … Jerry Landers
McCloud (1974)
- Episode "The Colorado Cattle Caper" … Deputy Dewey Cobb (TV series)
Owen Marshall, Counselor at Law (1973) 
- Episode "The Camerons Are a Special Clan" … Clark (TV series)

Soundtrack
Logan Lucky (2017) [song (co-written) "Take Me Home, Country Roads", "Some Days Are Diamonds (Some Days Are Stone)"]
Kingsman: The Golden Circle  (2017) [song (co-written) "Take Me Home,  Country Road"]
Alien: Covenant (2017) [song (co-written) "Take Me Home, Country Roads"]
Okja (2017) (song "Annie's Song")
Free Fire (2017) (song "Annie's Song")
John Denver: A Song's Best Friend (2004) (songs)
Catch Me If You Can (2002) (from "Leaving on a Jet Plane") 
The Wedding Planner (2001) (song "Annie's Song")
Take Me Home: The John Denver Story (2000) (TV) (songs) 
Final Destination (2000) (song "Rocky Mountain High") 
Armageddon (1998) (song "Leaving on a Jet Plane") 
My Best Friend's Wedding (1997) (song "Annie's Song") 
The Rock (1996) (song "Leaving on a Jet Plane") 
Whisper of the Heart (1995) (song "Take Me Home, Country Roads") 
Son in Law (1993) (song "Thank God I'm a Country Boy")
The Christmas Gift (1986) (TV) (song "Love Again")
The Music for UNICEF Concert: A Gift of Song (1979) (song "Rhymes and Reasons") 
Centennial (1978) (song "I Guess He'd Rather Be in Colorado" performed by Merle Haggard)
Sunshine (1975) TV series (theme) 
The Bears and I (1974)
The New Land (1974) TV series 
Sierra (1974) TV series 
Sunshine (1973) (TV) 
Gospel Road: A Story of Jesus (1973)

Production
Higher Ground (1988) (TV) (co-executive producer)
Rocky Mountain Holiday with John Denver and the Muppets (1982) (TV) (producer) 
John Denver: Music and the Mountains (1981) (TV) (producer)

Writing
Take Me Home: The John Denver Story (2000) (TV) (book Take Me Home)

Television

John Denver: A Song's Best Friend (2004) (TV Movie/Documentary) (songs) … Himself, starring
Nature 
- John Denver: Let This Be a Voice (1998) TV episode … Himself
John Denver: A Portrait (1998) (V) … Himself
Today
- Episode dated 19 December 1996 (1996) TV episode … Himself
- Episode dated 15 June 1996 (1996) TV episode … Himself
- Episode dated 8 April 1991 (1991) TV episode … Himself
- Episode dated 27 March 1986 (1986) TV episode … Himself
- Episode dated 30 March 1984 (1984) TV episode … Himself
- Episode dated 5 July 1982 (1982) TV episode … Himself
John Denver: The Wildlife Concert (1995) (TV) … Himself
America Comes to Graceland (1993) (TV) … Himself
Montana Christmas Skies (1991) (TV) … Himself
Aspen (1991) … Himself
The Muppets Celebrate Jim Henson (1990) (TV) … Himself
The Tonight Show Starring Johnny Carson
- Episode dated 19 October 1990 (1990) TV episode … Himself
- Episode dated 3 December 1987 (1987) TV episode … Himself
- Episode dated 3 March 1986 (1986) TV episode … Himself
- Episode dated 29 May 1985 (1985) TV episode … Himself
- Episode dated 20 December 1984 (1984) TV episode … Himself
- Episode dated 26 August 1983 (1983) TV episode … Himself - Guest host
- Episode dated 4 May 1982 (1982) TV episode … Himself
- Episode dated 16 October 1978 (1978) TV episode … Himself - Guest host
NBC Nightly News 
- Episode dated 24 August 1989 (1989) TV episode … Himself
The Kennedy Center Honors: A Celebration of the Performing Arts (1988) (TV) … Himself
The 15th Annual American Music Awards (1988) (TV) … Himself
John Denver's Christmas in Aspen (1988) (TV) … Host
Julie Andrews: The Sound of Christmas (1987) (TV) … Himself
Magnum, P.I. (1987) (TV)
- Episode "Limbo" … (performer: "Looking for Space")
Farm Aid '87 (1987) (TV) … Himself
Liberty Weekend (1986) (TV) … Himself
The 27th Annual Grammy Awards (1985) (TV) … Himself - host
In Concert at the Met (1984) (TV) … Himself
Salute to Lady Liberty (1984) (TV) … Himself
Sixth Annual Ski Pro Am (March 9-14,19 1983) (TV) ... Himself - host
The 25th Annual Grammy Awards (1983) (TV) … Himself – host
The 24th Annual Grammy Awards (1982) (TV) … Himself – host
Fifth Annual Ski Pro Am (1982) (TV) ... Himself - host
Rocky Mountain Holiday with John Denver and the Muppets (1982) (TV) … Himself
John Denver: Live at Red Rocks (1982) Televised concert … Himself, starring
John Denver: Music and the Mountains (1981) (TV) … Himself
John Denver with His Special Guest George Burns: Two of a Kind (1981) (TV) … Himself
SportsWorld John Denver Celebrity 4th Annual Ski Pro Am (1981) (TV) ... Himself - host
The Tomorrow Show
- Episode dated 3 December 1980 (1980) TV episode … Himself
The John Davidson Show 
- Episode dated 30 October 1980 (1980) TV episode … Himself
Third Annual Ski Pro Am (March 4-9 1980) (TV) ... Himself - host
John Denver and the Muppets: A Christmas Together (1979) (TV) … Himself – host
The 3rd Barry Manilow Special (1979) (TV) … Himself
The Muppet Show 
- Episode #4.1 (1979) TV episode … Himself
Second Annual Ski Pro Am (March 1979) (TV) ... Himself - host
The 21st Annual Grammy Awards (1979) (TV) … Himself – host
The Music for UNICEF Concert: A Gift of Song (1979) (TV) … Himself – (performer: "Rhymes & Reasons")
First Annual Ski Pro Am (March 1979) (TV) ... Himself - host
The 20th Annual Grammy Awards (1978) (TV) … Host
Sinatra and Friends (1977) (TV) … Himself
The Carpenters' Very First Television Special (1976) (TV) … Himself
The John Denver Special (1976) (TV) … Himself
Van Dyke and Company 
- Episode dated 7 October 1976 (1976) TV episode 
The 28th Annual Primetime Emmy Awards (1976) (TV) … Himself – co-host
John Denver and Friends (1976) (TV) … Himself
The Merv Griffin Show 
- Episode dated 23 February 1976 (1976) TV episode … Himself
- Episode dated 6 May 1970 (1970) TV episode … Himself
John Denver's Rocky Mountain Christmas (1975) (TV) … Himself
Doris Day Today - Himself (1975; CBS TV special) 
McCloud (1974) (TV)
- Episode "The Colorado Cattle Caper" … TV episode - (performer: "I Guess He'd Rather Be in Colorado")
The John Denver Show (1973) TV series … Himself
John Denver: Live at Red Rocks (1973) Televised concert … Himself, starring
The Midnight Special 
- Episode dated 19 August 1972 (1972) TV episode … Himself
Philadelphia Folk Festival (1971) (TV) … Himself

References

External links
 John Denver's official website
 
 DVDs

Filmography
Male actor filmographies
American filmographies